Zell im Fichtelgebirge, formerly Zell (official name until July 2007) is a market town in the district of Hof in Bavaria in Germany.

Geography 
The heart of the market parish lies between the towns of Hof and Bayreuth, about 5 km from the B 2 federal road and about 10 km from the A 9 motorway. The River Saale rises on the Waldstein ridge in the Fichtelgebirge near Zell im Fichtelgebirge. The surrounding area may explored on some 30 kilometres of signposted hiking trails.

References 

Hof (district)